Original Sin is an original novel written by Andy Lane and part of the Virgin New Adventures based on the long-running British science fiction television series Doctor Who. It introduces the Seventh Doctor's new companions Roz Forrester and Chris Cwej.

Plot
Benny and the Doctor land on Earth in the late 30th century, in order to find out more information about a missing alien space ship.  They are eventually arrested for murder by Adjucator Roz Forrester and her partner/squire Chris Cwej.  The Doctor discovers that the person behind his arrest, and also responsible for supporting the Earth Empire, is none other than Tobias Vaughn, the former head of International Electromatics and collaborator with the Cybermen.  Just prior to his "death" (in The Invasion), Vaughn transferred his memories and consciousness into a robot body.  Since then, he has been manipulating Earth history in order to trap the Doctor and gain the secret to time travel.  The Doctor manages to trap Vaughn in the TARDIS, cutting him off from transferring his mind to a new body; he later removes Vaughn's brain crystal and installs it in a food machine.  Roz and Chris, now framed by corrupt Adjucator officials, agree to travel with the Doctor rather than face trumped-up charges.

References

External links

Reviews
The Whoniverse's review on Original Sin

1995 British novels
1995 science fiction novels
Virgin New Adventures
Novels by Andy Lane
Seventh Doctor novels
Fiction set in the 30th century